Sir James Roualeyn Hovell-Thurlow-Cumming-Bruce PC (9 March 1912 – 12 June 2000) was a British barrister and judge who was a Lord Justice of Appeal from 1977 to 1985.

Biography 
Roualeyn Cumming-Bruce was the third son of the Charles Edward Hovell-Thurlow-Cumming-Bruce, 6th Baron Thurlow, and the younger of identical twin boys. His grandfather was a British Liberal politician who was Paymaster-General in 1886. Earlier relations were Bishop of Durham and Lord Chancellor. His eldest brother Harry became 7th Baron Thurlow in 1952, and his elder twin brother Francis became 8th Baron Thurlow in 1971.

Roualeyn was educated at Shrewsbury School and Magdalene College, Cambridge, where he took a first in classics. He became an honorary Fellow at Magdalene in 1977. He was called to the Bar at Middle Temple in 1937, where he became a Bencher in 1959 and was Treasurer in 1975.

In the Second World War, he served in the Royal Artillery in North Africa and the Middle East, becoming a lieutenant colonel.

He resumed his mixed legal practice after the war.  He was Chancellor of the Diocese of Ripon from 1954 to 1957, Recorder of Doncaster from 1957 to 1958 and Recorder of York from 1958 to 1961. He was appointed Junior Counsel to the Treasury (Common Law) in 1959.

In 1964 he became a High Court judge (as Mr Justice Cumming-Bruce), in the Probate, Divorce and Admiralty Division (later the Family Division) and received the customary knighthood. He presided over some interesting divorce cases: he granted a divorce to the wife of Tony Hancock for cruelty and adultery.

Despite a conviction for drunk driving 18 months earlier, he was promoted to the Court of Appeal (as Lord Justice Cumming-Bruce) and joined the Privy Council in 1977. One of his early appeal cases was Miller v. Jackson, in which he joined Lord Denning in ruling that a cricket club could continue to play matches on a village green, even though balls were occasionally hit onto neighbouring properties.

Family 
He married Lady Sarah Savile, the youngest daughter of the 6th Earl of Mexborough, in 1955. She predeceased him in 1991. They had a daughter and two sons.

His identical twin brother Francis, the eighth Baron Thurlow, was High Commissioner to New Zealand from 1959 to 1963, High Commissioner to Nigeria from 1963 to 1966, and Governor of The Bahamas from 1968 to 1972. Francis was a knight in the Order of St Michael and St George (KCMG).

References
Obituary The Daily Telegraph, 14 June 2000
Obituary, The Guardian, 15 June 2000
Obituary, York Evening Press, 19 June 2000

1912 births
2000 deaths
British Army personnel of World War II
20th-century English judges
Family Division judges
Lords Justices of Appeal
Knights Bachelor
Members of the Privy Council of the United Kingdom
Members of the Middle Temple
People educated at Shrewsbury School
Alumni of Magdalene College, Cambridge
Fellows of Magdalene College, Cambridge
Identical twins
Younger sons of barons
Roualeyn
English twins
Probate, Divorce and Admiralty Division judges
Royal Artillery officers